This is a List of NCAA Division I non-football programs – colleges and universities that are members of Division I of the National Collegiate Athletic Association but do not sponsor varsity football teams. Before 2006, these schools were officially designated as Division I–AAA. This list includes schools in the process of transitioning to Division I, but are not yet full D–I members. Some have had football teams in the past; some never have.

Four of them also field full-sized football teams; the only one that does not is Bellarmine, which is thus still considered "non-football" by the NCAA.

 * = These schools had football teams when they were junior colleges, but none have since becoming universities.

References

College football-related lists
Non-football programs